The video sharing platform YouTube has become widely used in educational settings.

History 
YouTube was founded as a video distribution platform in 2005 and is now the most visited website in the US as of 2019.  Almost immediately after the site's launch, educational institutions, such as MIT OpenCourseWare and TED, were using it for the distribution of their content. Soon after, many independent creators began to experiment with science learning. Some of the most popular early educators are listed below:

Khan Academy 
Khan Academy creates tutorials in almost all areas of science and mathematics, as well as providing official SAT preparation. The YouTube channel was founded in 2006 by Sal Khan who at the time was working as a financial analyst. The videos he created reached unprecedented levels of popularity, with hundreds of millions of views in the first few years of operation. This lead Khan to start the Khan Academy Non-profit Organization in 2008 and quit his job to focus on education in 2009. To date, Khan Academy has produced over 20,000 videos with over 1.7 billion views on YouTube.

Smarter Every Day 
Destin Sandlin, the creator of the YouTube channel "Smarter Every Day", has been posting educational videos on the site since 2007. Each episode of the series poses a specific question or topic. Over the course of about a half an hour, Destin meets with experts and experiments with different concepts in order to gain an in depth understanding of the topic, and presents it to the YouTube audience. Destin's videos covers everything from in depth rocket science to understanding the way our brain works by training to use a "backwards bike".

Vsauce 
Vsauce began in the mind of Michael Stevens in 2010, with the name itself coming from a random name generator. The channel originally focused on shows such as DONG (Do Online Now Guys) which showcased cool and interesting websites. However, the main videos on the Vsauce channel that gained a massive amount of attention came with the educational videos. In these short videos, Michael takes a simple question and uses math, physics, and even psychology to deconstruct the question and pose an interesting conclusion to the topic through the lens of analytic thinking. Today, Vsauce is now one of the most popular educational channels on the platform, and has led to the creation of other channels such as Vsauce 2 and 3, hosted by Kevin Lieber and Jake Roper respectively. Michael also co-hosted a live show called Brain Candy Live! with Mythbusters' former host Adam Savage which toured across the United States in 2017.

YouTube EDU
YouTube created YouTube EDU in 2009 as a repository for its educational content. As of 2015, over 700,000 videos were part of YouTube EDU. Content within YouTube EDU is produced by PBS, Khan Academy, Steve Spangler Science, Numberphile, and TED, among others.

Medical education
YouTube videos have been used to teach medical content. In an anatomy course incorporating YouTube, 98% of students watched the assigned videos and 92% stated that they were helpful in teaching anatomical concepts. A 2013 study focused on clinical skills education from YouTube found that the 100 most accessible videos across a variety of topics (venipuncture, wound care, pain assessment, CPR, and others) were generally unsatisfactory.

The value of YouTube in relation to dentistry and dental education has also been evaluated. Dentistry videos specifically categorized as "education" were rated as having a much higher value to dentistry students compared to videos in the more broad "all" category. Most of the videos marked as "education" were viewed as remarkably high quality by dental experts.

See also 
StudyTube
Social impact of YouTube
Science communication
Science education

References 

YouTube
Educational websites
Education-related YouTube channels
Science communication
Open educational resources